The 2020 Rolex Paris Masters was a professional tennis tournament played on indoor hard courts. It was the 48th edition of the tournament, and a Masters 1000 event on the 2020 ATP Tour.

Due to the COVID-19 pandemic in France, it took place with no fans. It was held at the Palais omnisports de Paris-Bercy in Paris, France, between 2 and 8 November 2020.

Singles main-draw entrants

Seeds

1 Rankings are as of 26 October 2020

Other entrants
The following players received wild cards into the main singles draw:
  Benjamin Bonzi
  Hugo Gaston
  Pierre-Hugues Herbert
  Corentin Moutet

The following player received entry using a special exempt into the main singles draw:
  Kevin Anderson

The following players received entry from the singles qualifying draw:
  Marco Cecchinato
  Alejandro Davidovich Fokina
  Federico Delbonis
  Márton Fucsovics
  Marcos Giron
  Norbert Gombos
  Stefano Travaglia

The following players received entry as lucky losers:
  Radu Albot
  Salvatore Caruso
  Federico Coria
  Laslo Đere

Withdrawals
  Roberto Bautista Agut → replaced by  Tommy Paul
  Grigor Dimitrov → replaced by  Radu Albot
  Novak Djokovic → replaced by  Feliciano López
  Kyle Edmund → replaced by  Aljaž Bedene
  Fabio Fognini → replaced by  Pablo Andújar
  Cristian Garín → replaced by  Salvatore Caruso
  John Isner → replaced by  Tennys Sandgren
  Nick Kyrgios → replaced by  Lorenzo Sonego
  Gaël Monfils → replaced by  Jordan Thompson
  Kei Nishikori → replaced by  Gilles Simon
  Reilly Opelka → replaced by  Alexander Bublik
  Benoît Paire → replaced by  Federico Coria
  Guido Pella → replaced by  Richard Gasquet
  Denis Shapovalov → replaced by  Yoshihito Nishioka
  Dominic Thiem → replaced by  Laslo Đere

Doubles main-draw entrants

Seeds

 1 Rankings are as of 26 October 2020

Other entrants
The following pairs received wildcards into the doubles main draw:
  Hugo Gaston /  Ugo Humbert 
  Adrian Mannarino /  Gilles Simon

The following pairs received entry into the doubles main draw as alternates:
  Marcelo Arévalo /  Matwé Middelkoop
  Nikola Ćaćić /  Dušan Lajović
  Marcus Daniell /  Philipp Oswald
  Hugo Nys /  Artem Sitak

Champions

Singles

  Daniil Medvedev def.  Alexander Zverev, 5–7, 6–4, 6–1.

Doubles

  Félix Auger-Aliassime /  Hubert Hurkacz def.  Mate Pavić /  Bruno Soares, 6–7(3–7), 7–6(9–7), [10–2].

References

External links
 
 ATP tournament profile